

High schools
 Middletown High School

Middle schools
 Beman Middle School

Elementary schools
 Bielefield School
 Farm Hill School
 Lawrence School
 Macdonough School
 Moody School
 Snow School
 Spencer School
 Wesley School

Others:
 Middletown Adult Education
 Transition to Life Center - A school for students aged between 18 and 21

References

External links
 Official website

Middletown, Connecticut
Education in Middlesex County, Connecticut
School districts in Connecticut